The 2016 Collingwood Football Club season was the club's 120th season of senior competition in the Australian Football League (AFL). The club also fielded its reserves team in the VFL.

Squad

 Players are listed by guernsey number, and 2016 statistics are for AFL regular season and finals series matches during the 2016 AFL season only. Career statistics include a player's complete AFL career, which, as a result, means that a player's debut and part or whole of their career statistics may be for another club. Statistics are correct as of Round 23 of the 2016 season (28 August 2016) and are taken from AFL Tables

Squad changes

In

Out

Season summary

Pre-season matches

Regular season

Ladder

Awards & Milestones

AFL Awards
 Anzac Medal – Steele Sidebottom (Round 5)
 2016 22under22 selection – Darcy Moore
 2016 22under22 selection – Brodie Grundy

AFL Award Nominations
 Round 8 – 2016 AFL Goal of the Year nomination – Taylor Adams
 Round 19 – 2016 AFL Rising Star nomination – Darcy Moore
 2016 All-Australian team 40-man squad – Scott Pendlebury, Adam Treloar

Club Awards
  – Scott Pendlebury
  – Adam Treloar
  – Steele Sidebottom
  – Brodie Grundy
  – Jeremy Howe
  – Brent Macaffer
  – Brent Macaffer
  – Josh Smith
  – Alex Fasolo
  – Scott Pendlebury

Milestones
 Round 1 – Adam Treloar (Collingwood debut)
 Round 2 – James Aish (Collingwood debut)
 Round 3 – Jeremy Howe (Collingwood debut)
 Round 3 – Matthew Goodyear (AFL debut)
 Round 5 – Mason Cox (AFL debut)
 Round 5 – Josh Smith (AFL debut)
 Round 7 – Ben Crocker (AFL debut)
 Round 7 – Jarryd Blair (100 goals)
 Round 8 – Jack Frost (50 games)
 Round 8 – Nathan Buckley (100 games as coach)
 Round 9 – Alex Fasolo (100 goals)
 Round 9 – Steele Sidebottom (150 games)
 Round 10 – Brodie Grundy (50 games)
 Round 10 – Jack Crisp (50 AFL games)
 Round 12 – Tom Phillips (AFL debut)
 Round 14 – Collingwood's 1500th VFL/AFL win
 Round 19 – Rupert Wills (AFL debut)
 Round 20 – Levi Greenwood (100 AFL games)
 Round 22 – Adam Treloar (100 AFL games)

VFL season

Pre-season matches

Regular season

Finals series

Ladder

Notes
 Key
 H ^ Home match.
 A ^ Away match.

 Notes
Collingwood's scores are indicated in bold font.

References

External links
 Official website of the Collingwood Football Club
 Official website of the Australian Football League

2016
Collingwood Football Club